André-Pierre Christian Gignac (born 5 December 1985) is a French professional footballer who plays as a striker for Liga MX club Tigres UANL. 

He is known personally by teammates and friends as simply "Dédé".

Gignac began his career in his home department of Bouches-du-Rhône, playing for local club Fos and Martigues. In 2002, he ventured to the Brittany region to join professional club Lorient. He starred for the club for two seasons, which included a loan stint at amateur club Pau. He then joined Toulouse in 2007, amid controversial circumstances. After early struggles Gignac reached prominence during the 2008–09 season, becoming the league's top scorer with 24 goals. After a sub-par 2009–10 season with Toulouse, Gignac joined the defending champions Marseille in August 2010 on a five-year contract. He scored 77 goals in 186 matches across all competitions for OM, winning two consecutive Coupe de la Ligue titles and the 2011 Trophée des Champions. After his contract expired he moved to Mexico to play for Tigres UANL, where he has become the club's all-time top scorer in all competitions.

Gignac is a France international and made his debut with the team in April 2009 against Lithuania as a result of his good form with Toulouse. He scored his first international goal five months later against the Faroe Islands. Gignac made his first major international appearance for his country at the 2010 FIFA World Cup, featuring in all three matches the team contested. He also represented his country at UEFA Euro 2016, in which they were runners-up.

Early life
Gignac was born in the city of Martigues in Bouches-du-Rhône in the south of France. Gignac is of partial Romani descent, but in an interview with French football magazine So Foot he stated he considers himself to be an adopted Manouche. He is the cousin of former defender Jacques Abardonado and winger Yohan Mollo.

Early career
Gignac began his career with local club ES Fos-sur-Mer. He spent five years at the club before joining hometown club Martigues. After almost seven years at the club, Gignac was released after being informed he needed to bulk up. After developing in the club's academy for two seasons, Gignac was promoted to the club's senior team for the 2004–05 Ligue 2 season by manager Christian Gourcuff.

Club career

Lorient
Gignac made his professional debut with Lorient on 13 August 2004, coming on as a substitute in the 78th minute with the score tied 1–1 against Châteauroux. Within seconds of coming on, he scored the winning goal to bring Lorient a 2–1 victory. An elated Gignac later said after scoring the match-winning goal that he "thought he was Ronaldo". In subsequent matches, Gignac was minor presence within the team featuring primarily as a substitute. Gignac scored his only other goal in the season against Reims in a 4–1 victory on 29 October. The following week he made his first professional start, in a 2–1 defeat to Le Mans, playing 70 minutes.

Pau
The following season, Lorient achieved promotion to Ligue 1, though without Gignac's services as he was loaned out to Championnat National club Pau during the winter transfer period. Prior to the loan, Gignac had appeared in only one match for the club in the season. At Pau, Gignac featured as a starter for the first time in his career. He appeared in 20 league matches for the club and scored eight goals. Notable appearances with the team included a double in a victory over Toulon and a hat-trick against Châtellerault. The week before the match against Châtellerault, Gignac scored the equalizing goal against Romorantin in a 1–1 draw.

Back to Lorient
Gignac's newfound confidence saw the player return to Lorient senior team for the 2006–07 Ligue 1 season where he was inserted as starter. Initially, he began the season as a substitute, appearing as a replacement in the first three league matches. In the team's fourth league match against Derby Breton rivals Nantes, Gignac started the match and repaid manager Gourcuff by converting a hat-trick in 27 minutes in a 3–1 victory. On 4 November 2006, he scored the match-winning goal away to Marseille and, in December, scored goals in back-to-back matches against Sedan and Auxerre. Gignac finished the campaign with 37 appearances in the league and nine goals, a club best.

Toulouse

2007–08 season

On 25 June 2007, it was announced Gignac had signed a four-year deal with Toulouse. However, it was revealed soon after that Lorient had accepted a €4.5 million bid from Lille and that the player had already agreed to a pre-contract with the Northern side, putting his move to Toulouse in jeopardy. Despite this, Toulouse trumped Lille's offer by offering the player more than double the salary he had been offered by Lille. The clubs entered a war of words, with Toulouse questioning the legitimacy of Lille's agreement while Gignac and Lille questioned the ethics and tactics of Toulouse. Eventually, Gignac's move to Toulouse was validated.

Gignac made his competitive debut for Toulouse in the first leg of the club's UEFA Champions League third qualifying round match against Liverpool, coming on as a substitute in the 65th minute. Toulouse lost the match 1–0 and conceded the two-legged tie 5–0 on aggregate, thus being eliminated from the Champions League. On 4 October 2007, after coming on as a substitute for Swedish striker Johan Elmander, Gignac scored a last-minute goal against Bulgarian club CSKA Sofia to cancel out Nei's opening goal from the penalty spot and enable Toulouse to progress to the group stages of the UEFA Cup on the away goals rule. Despite the hype, both Gignac and Toulouse had disappointing 2007–08 seasons, with Gignac appearing in 28 matches and scoring only 2 goals. Toulouse finished the season in 17th place, just one place above the relegation zone. Some media outlets attributed Gignac's struggle for form to him playing second fiddle to Johan Elmander. Gignac also struggled with weight problems during the season.

2008–09 season

In the 2008–09 season, Gignac's form blossomed as he became first-choice striker following the departure of Johan Elmander to Bolton Wanderers. He scored his first goal of the season in Toulouse's second match, against Le Havre, with an 88th-minute strike to seal a 2–1 victory. Over the course of the season, Gignac scored several vital goals for his club, notably braces against Sochaux, Grenoble, Saint-Étienne, Marseille and twice against Nice, including his final two goals of the season. He overtook Johan Elmander (Toulouse's top scorer the season prior with 11 goals) during the 19th league match. In the events leading up to the 31st matchday, he was challenged by his coach Alain Casanova to score a goal with his left foot (weak foot). The coach promised to kiss his left foot in front of everyone if he scored with his left foot against Nantes in that match. Gignac practiced shooting with his left foot the entire week and in the match, he scored the only goal of the night with his left foot. Afterwards, he ran towards the coach where Alain bowed down to kiss his foot but Gignac prevented him from doing so, out of respect for him and instead hugged Alain. (After this incident, Gignac improved upon his shooting abilities with his left foot and went on to score more goals with it.) For his efforts, he was awarded the UNFP Player of the Month award twice for September and March, nominated for the Ligue 1 Player of the Year Award (which was won by Yoann Gourcuff), selected to the Ligue 1 Team of the Year and received the league's top scorer award with 24 goals to his name.

2009–10 season
Gignac switched to the number 10 shirt for the 2009–10 season and, on 14 August 2009, signed a one-year contract extension tying him to Toulouse until 2013. The extension signaled an end to rumours of a move during the fall transfer window, where the player had been linked with moves to fellow Ligue 1 club Lyon, English Premier League clubs Arsenal and Manchester United and Italian Serie A clubs Juventus and AC Milan.

Gignac scored his first goal of the season on 15 August 2009 in a 3–1 victory over Saint-Étienne. Five days later, he scored a brace in the first leg of the club's playoff round match against Turkish club Trabzonspor. The 3–1 result in the first leg was enough for Toulouse to reach the group stage of the competition where Gignac struck again, this time against Belgian side Club Brugge in a 2–2 draw. After going scoreless for seven weeks in the league, on 24 October, Gignac scored the second goal in the club's 2–0 away win over Lens. Two weeks later, Gignac scored the game-winning goal against Rennes. Two months later, he scored both goals in another 2–0 victory, this time against Sochaux. On 16 January 2010, Gignac provided the assists on all three goals scored by the club in its 3–1 win over Valenciennes. Despite being injured for the majority of the spring campaign, Gignac finished the season as the club's top scorer.

Gignac totalled 34 Ligue 1 goals for Toulouse, remaining their highest scorer in the league in the 21st century until September 2014, when his record was surpassed by Wissam Ben Yedder.

Marseille

2010–11 season
On 20 August 2010, prior to the start of the press conference for new signing Loïc Rémy, Marseille club president Jean-Claude Dassier confirmed the club had reached a tentative agreement with Toulouse for the transfer of Gignac. Gignac underwent a medical the following day and signed a five-year contract. The transfer fee was undisclosed but was reported to be within the region of €16–18 million. Gignac was assigned the number 10 shirt and made his club debut nine days after signing in a league match against Bordeaux. He scored his first goal for the club two months later in a 1–1 draw with Saint-Étienne. On 3 November, Gignac scored a hat-trick in the 7–0 away win against Slovak club MŠK Žilina in a UEFA Champions League group stage match.

Gignac endured a rough patch for the majority of the season, which led to criticism from local media, club supporters and former club players, most notably Jean-Pierre Papin, who said Gignac's game had "become too predictable". Gignac admitted the criticism was justified and stated that "you will see the real Gignac in 2011". Following the winter break, Gignac attempted to live up to his declaration by scoring in the team's first league match in a 2–1 win over Bordeaux. Three days later, he scored the second goal in a 2–0 victory over Auxerre in the Coupe de la Ligue. The win sent Marseille to the competition's final match. On 5 February, he scored a goal in a win over Arles-Avignon and, in the following week, scored both goals in a 2–1 victory over Sochaux. He played the full 90 minutes in the 2011 Coupe de la Ligue Final on 23 April, a 1–0 win over Montpellier.

2011–12 season
Gignac was not named in the Marseille squad for the 2011 Trophée des Champions on 27 July, which they won 5–4 against Lille at the Stade de Tanger in Morocco. He was close to a move to English Premier League club Fulham during the transfer window, but this collapsed at the last moment as Marseille failed to bring in Amauri as a replacement. He was also offered as part of a failed bid for Sunderland's Asamoah Gyan. Gignac expressed frustration at the move to Fulham being called off.

On 26 November 2011, Gignac was relegated to Marseille's reserve squad. He made only six league starts during the season, and his only goal came in the penultimate match against Sochaux, when he came on in the 50th minute for Rémy and concluded a 3–0 home victory. He was an unused substitute on 14 April as Marseille won the 2012 Coupe de la Ligue Final against Lyon.

2012–13 season

Despite Marseille finishing tenth in the league, their Coupe de la Ligue win earned them entry into the UEFA Europa League. In the third qualifying round, Gignac scored in each leg of a 4–1 aggregate victory over Turkish club Eskişehirspor.

Gignac regained his position on the first team and scored in Marseille's first home match of the season, a first in a 2–0 win over Sochaux. He then scored the only goal of an away victory over reigning league champions Montpellier. Gignac scored two first-half goals against Paris Saint-Germain in Le Classique on 7 October, to secure a draw for the home side and to retain the league lead. On 6 January 2013, he scored twice, including the extra-time winner, as Marseille won 2–1 against Guingamp in the last 64 of the Coupe de France. Gignac's 13 goals eventually helped Marseille to second place, behind PSG.

2013–14 season

Gignac scored in each of Marseille's three opening matches of the league season, all victories, with the third being the 84th-minute only goal of an away win at Valenciennes on 24 August. In January 2014, he scored braces in consecutive rounds of the Coupe de France: an extra-time double to dispatch Reims in the round of 64 on 5 January, and a further two in a 4–5 home defeat to Nice 16 days later. On 4 May, he scored twice in a 4–2 win over Lyon, finishing the season with 16 league goals, joint-second with four other players behind PSG's Zlatan Ibrahimović.

2014–15 season
Gignac began the season with two goals in a 3–3 draw at Bastia on 9 August 2014, the first being the first goal under new manager Marcelo Bielsa, and the latter a penalty. On 20 September, he scored Marseille's first two goals as they defeated Rennes 3−0 and moved to the top of the Ligue 1 standings. Three days later, he scored another double in a 5–0 thrashing away to Stade de Reims.

On 4 January 2015, in the round of 64 of the Coupe de France away to fourth-tier Grenoble, Gignac scored twice in the first half in an eventual 3–3 draw which ended in his team losing on penalties. He scored a further two on 5 April as Marseille hosted rivals PSG, twice putting his team ahead in an eventual 2–3 loss. The 2014–15 season saw Gignac get his best goal return for Marseille, scoring 23 times in all competitions and 21 in Ligue 1 play as he finished runner-up to Lyon's Alexandre Lacazette for the league's golden boot.

Tigres UANL
On 18 June 2015, Gignac signed with Mexican club Tigres UANL, ending rumours of alleged interest from several European teams. Upon signing, he said his ambition to join the club was to win the domestic league and help his side reach the final of Copa Libertadores. Gignac made his official debut with Tigres on 15 July in the away game of semi-finals of the 2015 Copa Libertadores against Brazilian side Internacional at the Estádio Beira-Rio, a 2–1 defeat. In the second leg, he scored his first goal to open a 3–1 victory, taking his team into the finals against River Plate of Argentina.

After losing the 2015 Copa Libertadores finals, Gignac debuted in the Apertura 2015 season of Liga MX on 9 August, scoring in a 2–2 draw against Guadalajara at the Estadio Universitario. Six days later, he recorded a hat-trick in a 4–1 home win over Chiapas for the first win of the season for the Nuevo León-based team. He made his debut in the Clásico Regiomontano by scoring the second goal of the 3–1 home victory over arch-rival Monterrey on 19 September. Gignac's 11 goals contributed to the team reaching the championship stage, in which he scored in each leg of a 3–1 aggregate win over Chiapas in the quarter-finals. He repeated the feat in the 4–4 draw against Pumas in the final, also converting his attempt as they won in a penalty shootout.

The following 30 January, Gignac scored his second hat-trick for Tigres, as they won 3–1 at home against León in the Clausura 2016 season. He scored against Querétaro for his 5th consecutive match of the season, in a 2–2 draw. Gignac scored 13 goals in regular season and finished as the top goal scorer of the Clausura 2016.

On 2 March 2016, Gignac scored a late goal against Real Salt Lake in a 1–1 away draw, for a 3–1 aggregate win in the quarter-finals of the 2015–16 CONCACAF Champions League. On 5 April, he scored twice in the final six minutes of a 2–0 home win over Querétaro (same score aggregate) to advance his team to the final, where on 27 April in the second leg of the finals against América at the Estadio Azteca, he scored the goal of the 2–1 defeat (losing the aggregate by 4–1).

Gignac scored a hat-trick in quarter-finals of the Apertura 2016 season playoffs against Pumas. He scored one goal in each, first and second leg of semi-finals against León. In the first leg of the finals against América he scored the goal of the 1–1 draw, also converting his attempt as they won in a penalty shootout in the second leg. In the last match of the Clausura 2017 season, he scored a hat-trick in the 5–1 victory over Querétaro that qualified Tigres to playoffs. In quarter-finals, Tigres faced city rival: Monterrey. Gignac had only scored one goal in six previous derbies. Tigres won 4–1 in the first leg and 2–0 in the second leg, with Gignac scoring twice in both matches. In the home leg of the finals against Guadalajara, Gignac scored twice to level the score at 2–2.

On 15 July 2018, Gignac scored in Tigres' 4–0 Campeón de Campeones victory over Santos Laguna, tying Walter Gaitán's record of 80 goals with the club and becoming the club's joint-second highest scorer. A week later, Gignac scored in the 2–0 league win over León, surpassing Gaitán with 81 goals to become the lone second-highest goalscorer in club history.

On 4 August 2019, Gignac scored in Tigres' 1–0 victory over Pumas, becoming the club's all-time top scorer in all competitions. His goal against Pumas took his tally in Tigres to 105 goals, surpassing the club's previous recordholder, Tomás Boy.

On 1 March 2020, he scored a bicycle kick in a 3–0 win against Pumas in Liga MX Clausura 2020. This goal has been nominated for the FIFA Puskás Award 2020. On 22 December 2020, Gignac scored the winning goal in a 2–1 win over Los Angeles FC in the 2020 CONCACAF Champions League Final. On 4 February 2021, Gignac scored a brace in a 2–1 win against Ulsan Hyundai in the second round of the 2020 FIFA Club World Cup. On 7 February, he scored a penalty in a 1–0 win over Palmeiras in the semi-finals, to help his team to become the first Mexican club to reach the final of the competition. He later extended his contract until 2024.

International career

Gignac received his first international call-up for France for the 2010 FIFA World Cup qualifying match against Lithuania. He missed the first match due to injury, but was fit enough to earn his first cap on 1 April 2009 coming on as a substitute in the 69th minute and providing the assist to Franck Ribéry's goal in the 1–0 victory. On 12 August 2009, Gignac scored France's lone goal after 42 minutes when set up by Florent Malouda against last-place Faroe Islands in a World Cup qualifier in Tórshavn. On 10 October, he scored a brace in a five-minute span, again against the Faroes, in France's 5–0 rout in Guingamp, securing a place in the play-offs. Four days later, Gignac struck against Austria, scoring the final goal in France's 3–1 victory after appearing as a substitute for Thierry Henry in the second half.

On 11 May 2010, Gignac was named to France manager Raymond Domenech's 30-man preliminary squad to participate in the 2010 World Cup tournament proper. He was later named in the 23-man team to compete in the competition, after which he was issued shirt number 11 for the tournament. On 11 June, Gignac made his World Cup debut in the nation's opening group stage match against Uruguay, replacing Sidney Govou as a substitute in the 85th minute of a goalless draw. He also appeared in the final two group stage matches, which included a start against the hosts South Africa. France lost the match 2–1, which resulted in the team's elimination from the competition.

On 6 September 2013, Gignac made his first appearance for France in three years during a 0–0 draw with Georgia in qualification for the 2014 World Cup. His next appearance came as a late substitute in a friendly against Portugal on 11 October 2014. Three days later, he was selected to start in France's away friendly against Armenia, scoring his first international goal in five years from a penalty kick in a 3–0 win, after Paul Pogba was brought down by Varazdat Haroyan. On 13 November 2015, he scored France's second goal in a 2–0 home friendly victory over defending world champions Germany, a powerful header from a Blaise Matuidi cross. He was named in Didier Deschamps' squad for their hosting of UEFA Euro 2016, making Gignac the first Mexico-based player in European Championship history. He played six of their seven matches – starting only the goalless group draw with Switzerland – and was a 78th-minute substitute for Olivier Giroud in the final that the team lost to Portugal in extra time. In this match, Gignac came close to securing the title for France, hitting the post in the last minute of regular time. Later on, Gignac was included in the French squad for the 2020 Summer Olympics.

Personal life
In 2019, Gignac gained Mexican citizenship.

Career statistics

Club

International

Scores and results list France's goal tally first.

Honours
Marseille
Coupe de la Ligue: 2010–11, 2011–12

Tigres UANL
Liga MX: Apertura 2015, Apertura 2016, Apertura 2017, Clausura 2019
Campeón de Campeones: 2016, 2017, 2018
CONCACAF Champions League: 2020
FIFA Club World Cup runner-up: 2020
Campeones Cup: 2018

France
UEFA European Championship runner-up: 2016

Individual
UNFP Ligue 1 Player of the Month: September 2008, March 2009, September 2014
UNFP Ligue 1 Team of the Year: 2008–09
Ligue 1 top goalscorer: 2008–09
Liga MX Best XI: Apertura 2015, Clausura 2016, Clausura 2017, Apertura 2018, Clausura 2019, Clausura 2022
Liga MX Golden Boot: Clausura 2016, Apertura 2018, Clausura 2022
Liga MX Best Forward: 2015–16, 2018–19
Liga MX Balón de Oro: 2015–16
CONCACAF Best XI: 2016
CONCACAF Champions League Golden Ball: 2020
CONCACAF Champions League Golden Boot: 2020
CONCACAF Champions League Team of the Tournament: 2020
FIFA Club World Cup Silver Ball: 2020
FIFA Club World Cup top goalscorer: 2020
Liga MX All-Star: 2021

References

External links

 
 
 

1985 births
Living people
People from Martigues
Sportspeople from Bouches-du-Rhône
French footballers
France international footballers
Association football forwards
FC Martigues players
FC Lorient players
Pau FC players
Toulouse FC players
Olympique de Marseille players
Tigres UANL footballers
Ligue 2 players
Ligue 1 players
Liga MX players
2010 FIFA World Cup players
UEFA Euro 2016 players
French expatriate footballers
Expatriate footballers in Mexico
French expatriate sportspeople in Mexico
French people of Romani descent
French Romani people
Romani footballers
Olympic footballers of France
Footballers at the 2020 Summer Olympics
Footballers from Provence-Alpes-Côte d'Azur
Naturalized citizens of Mexico